Vasilis Tsivilikas (Thessaloniki, January 17, 1942 – Athens, February 29, 2012) was a Greek comedy actor with significant appearances in the Greek film industry, television and especially theater.

Biography 
He was born on January 17, 1942, in Thessaloniki, originated from Domnista and Megalo Chorio Evrytanias. He was the first child of his family that later additionally had two daughters. His sister Eleni Tsivilika is an archaeologist of National Archaeological Museum of Athens, with excavations in Crete and Cyclades. His father was a shopkeeper, provided for his family a comfortable life and loved theater.

He studied in the American College of Thessaloniki "Anatolia". His professors there urged him to engage with acting, initially by participating in school's theatrical team. After completing his undergraduate courses he was accepted in the School of English Language and Literature, which dropped out to move in Athens and to eventually move forward professionally with acting.

After a failed attempt to be accepted in Theatro Technis, he eventually studied acting in the acting school of Pelos Katselis.

His first theatrical performance was in 1965 at Nea Ionia. Two years later Karolos Koun invited him to Theatro Technis. In early 1970s he got involved with satire plays and in the mid-1970s with prose.

70s was the decade he first appeared in cinema. The first movie he appeared was I theia mou, i hipissa by Alekos Sakellarios.

On February 29, 2012, at the age of 70, he had a heart complication and died during his transfer to Sismanogleio General Hospital.

He was married to lawyer Aliki Tsivilika and father of one son and one daughter.

He was performing in theater until his last day, at the play "I zoi podilato".

Filmography

Cinema 
Xafnikos peirasmos 1988
Poniro tet-a-tet 1987
I garsoniera tis trellas 1986
Sou harizo ti gynaika mou 1986
Apopse tha ti vroume! 1985 
Ena tragoudi tha sou po... 1985
Pantreftite giati hanomaste 1985 
To eidolo 1985 
Tora thelo... tora! 1980
Psyhi kai sarka 1974
I Rena einai 'off-side'  1972
O kyrios stathmarhis 1972
O magas me to trikyklo 1972
O katergaris 1971
Ziteitai epeigontos gabros 1971
I theia mou, i hipissa 1970

Television 
Pos na klepsete tous klironomous sas (TV Movie) 2007 
Ohi tora agapoula (TV Movie) 2006 
Baby Style (TV Series) 2001
Oute gata oute zimia (TV Movie) 2001 
Aroma gynaikas (TV Series) 2000
Pyrotehnimata sto tsepaki sou (TV Movie) 1999
Oti peite upourge mou (TV Movie) 1998
Hi Rock (TV Series) 1992 
O kyrios synigoros (TV Series) 1990
Vradya epitheorisis (TV Series) 1984
Theoi ston Olympo (TV Series) 1978
Antipetherini (TV Movie) 1978
Istories horis dakrya (TV Series) 1977
Thomas epi... Kolono (TV Series) 1977 
Hilia hronia prin – Vyzantio: I giorti ton Kalendon (TV Movie) 1977
Atsides... (TV Series) 1976
Viva Katerina (TV Series) 1973
En touto nika (TV Series) 1973 
Axiomatikos ypiresias (TV Series short) 1972
To theatro tis Defteras (TV Series) 1970

Theatrical performances 
Zoi podilato (adapt. 'A Bedfull of Foreigners' by Dave Freeman, adapt.-dir. V. Tsivilikas, theater Academos theater, Avlea theater 2011–2012).
Lysistrata (Aristophanes, dir. Th. Karakatsani, trans. K. Myris, summer 2011)
Thesmophoriazusae (Aristophanes, dir. N. Charalambous, trans. K. Georgousopoulos, summer 2009)
The Doctor in Spite of Himself (Molière, trans. K. Georgousopoulos, dir. V. Tsivilikas, summer 2008)
Out of Order (Ray Cooney, trans. V. Tsivilikas, Peroke theater, winter 2008)L'Étourdi ou les Contretemps (Molière, dir. V. Tsivilikas,Peroke theater 2004–2005 and summer 2005)The Miser (Molière, dir. Κ. Damati, trans. Ερ. Μπελιέ, summers 2003–2007)Tons of Money (Α.Αyckbourn, W.Evans, A. Valentine, trans.-dir. V. Tsivilikas, Peroke theater 2006–2007).	Not Now, Darling (Ray Cooney, John Chapman, trans. V. Tsivilikas, Minoa theater 2005–2006). Caught in the Net (Ray Cooney, adapt.-dir. V. Tsivilikas, Minoa theater 2004–2005).Methysmena koufeta (trans.-dir. V. Tsivilikas, Gloria theater 2003–2004).The Secretary Bird (William Douglas-Home, dir. V. Tsivilikas) 2003.
Uproar in the House (A. Marriott-A. Foot, adapt.-dir. V. Tsivilikas, theater Park 2002).
Funny Money (Ray Cooney, trans.-dir. V. Tsivilikas, Gloria theater 2001–2002)
Oute gata oute zimia (Sakellarios-Giannakopoulos, dir. K. Tsianos, theater Park 2001)
A Bedfull of Foreigners (Dave Freeman, trans.-dir. V. Tsivilikas, Minoa theater 1999–2000)
Ke o Simitis thelei ton Germano tou (Michailidis-Makridis, Delfinario theater 1999).
Oloi sto kolpo (Mark Stone, dir. V. Tsivilikas, Minoa theater 1999).
Darling Mr. London (A. Marriott-B. Grant, dir. V. Tsivilikas, Minoa theater 1998–1999)
Athina 2000...me ta tessera (dir. V. Tsivilikas, Minoa theater 1997–1998)
Out of Order (Ray Cooney, dir. V. Tsivilikas, theater ΠΕΡΟΚΕ 1998)	
Skaei nyfi...SKAI gampros (Kambanis-Makridis-Georgiou, dir. V. Tsivilikas-Ε. Xanthopoulou, Metropolitan theater 1997). 
Treis pano dyo kato (Kambanis-Makridis, Peroke theater 1996–1997).
Bob and Mary (G. Margaritis, dir. V. Tsivilikas-Γ. Φίλη, Lampeti theater 1995–1996)
Posa kerakia ehei i tourta? (Kambanis-Makridis, dir. V. Tsivilikas, Kalouta theater 1995).
Ke mazi ke monos (N. Kambanis-V. Michailidis, Kalouta theater 1993–1994, Metropolitan theater 1994–1995)
Ela to vrady tha ime me mia fili sou (Kambanis-Makridis, dir. V. Tsivilikas, Kalouta theater 1992–1993, Metropolitan theater summer 1993).
Xypoliti sto parko (1977)
Kampiria (1975)
Tou antra tou polla vary (1972)
O peirasmos (G. Xenopoulos)
Epiloges (Bost)
The Birds (Aristophanes)
Pepsie (Pierre-Edmond Victor)
The Wedding (A. Chekhov)
Agia Ioanna (1966, Dionysia theater)

References

Sources 
Πινακοθήκη Γέλιου,από το Λογοθετίδη και μετά, Κώστας Παπασπήλιος, Εμπειρία εκδοτική, 2002, σελ. 158–167
«Βασίλης Τσιβιλίκας: Δεν με ενδιαφέρουν οι μυημένοι», "Το Βήμα", 14 Ιανουαρίου 2001, ανακτήθηκε 19 Σεπτεμβρίου 2008.

External links 

Information about Vasilis Tsivilikas from 90lepta

 Vasilis Tsivilikas: Η ΖΩΗ ΕΙΝΑΙ ΑΛΛΟΥ (Hellenic Broadcasting Corporation – ERT Archives) 

20th-century Greek male actors
1942 births
2012 deaths
Greek comedians
21st-century Greek male actors
Greek male film actors
Greek male stage actors
Greek male television actors
Actors from Thessaloniki